IPTP Networks is an international telecommunications company. Founded in Cyprus as a System Integrator in 1996, it developed into an international group over the next decade. IPTP Networks operates a global backbone as a Tier-1-class-network Internet Service Provider (ISP) providing connectivity through 225+ PoPs worldwide.

Operations 
IPTP operates a proprietary, multi-functional and redundant broadband MPLS network with approximately 229 points of presence (PoPs) and 77 hosting/colocation facilities throughout the world. The company utilizes Trans-Atlantic, Trans-Pacific, Trans-Eurasian, Indian and Mediterranean submarine and terrestrial assets (Optical fibre cable), connecting clients to key IXs (Internet exchange point) and global financial centres.

Peering

IPTP Networks is an Internet provider (AS41095). As a member of AMS-IX, DE-CIX, Linx, MSK-IX, Digital Realty Internet Exchange and so on it uses a selective Peering policy.
According to the European Internet Exchange Association (Euro-IX), IPTP Networks has presenced at more than 20 Euro-IX member IXPs.

In 2020, IPTP connected to IX.BR (Brazil), Australia IX, New Zealand IX, ZA-INX (South Africa) and VNIX (Vietnam).

In 2021, IPTP (ASN 51601) connected to Speed Internet Exchange - an Internet exchange platform in Amsterdam (the Netherlands) and also joined the BBIX Transit Partner Program (TPP).

GSM 
IPTP Networks acquired Wherr in 2013 and launched the Wherr GSM (Global System for Mobile Communications) tracking solution in Hong Kong in 2016.

References

Telecommunications companies of the United States
Telecommunications companies of Russia
Telecommunications companies of Cyprus
Telecommunications companies of the Netherlands
Telecommunications companies of Hong Kong